Tedrick is an historic town in Douglas County, Missouri, United States. The location is on a ridge east of Fox Creek and approximately one mile south-southeast of Champion.

A post office called Tedrick was established in 1898, and remained in operation until 1901. The community has the name of one Mr. Tedrick, the proprietor of a local mill.

References

Ghost towns in Missouri
Former populated places in Douglas County, Missouri